Purebreds are "cultivated varieties" of an animal species achieved through the process of selective breeding. When the lineage of a purebred animal is recorded, that animal is said to be "pedigreed". Purebreds breed true-to-type which means the progeny of like-to-like purebred parents will carry the same phenotype, or observable characteristics of the parents. A group of purebreds is called a pure-breeding line or strain.

True breeding

In the world of selective animal breeding, to "breed true" means that specimens of an animal breed will breed true-to-type when mated like-to-like; that is, that the progeny of any two individuals of the same breed will show fairly consistent, replicable and predictable characteristics, or traits with sufficiently high heritability. A puppy from two purebred dogs of the same breed, for example, will exhibit the traits of its parents, and not the traits of all breeds in the subject breed's ancestry.

However, breeding from too small a gene pool, especially direct inbreeding, can lead to the passing on of undesirable characteristics or even a collapse of a breed population due to inbreeding depression. Therefore, there is a question, and often heated controversy, as to when or if a breed may need to allow "outside" stock in for the purpose of improving the overall health and vigor of the breed.

Because pure-breeding creates a limited gene pool, purebred animal breeds are also susceptible to a wide range of congenital health problems. This problem is especially prevalent in competitive dog breeding and dog show circles due to the singular emphasis on aesthetics rather than health or function. Such problems also occur within certain segments of the horse industry for similar reasons. The problem is further compounded when breeders practice inbreeding. The opposite effect to that of the restricted gene pool caused by pure-breeding is known as hybrid vigor, which generally results in healthier animals.

Pedigrees

A pedigreed animal is one that has its ancestry recorded. Often this is tracked by a major registry. The number of generations required varies from breed to breed, but all pedigreed animals have papers from the registering body that attest to their ancestry.

The word "pedigree" appeared in the English language in 1410 as "pee de Grewe", "pedegrewe" or "pedegru", each of those words being borrowed to the Middle French "pié de grue", meaning "crane foot". This comes from a visual analogy between the trace of the bird's foot and the three lines used in the English official registers to show the ramifications of a genealogical tree.

Sometimes the word purebred is used synonymously with pedigreed, but purebred refers to the animal having a known ancestry, and pedigree refers to the written record of breeding. Not all purebred animals have their lineage in written form. For example, until the 20th century, the Bedouin people of the Arabian peninsula only recorded the ancestry of their Arabian horses via an oral tradition, supported by the swearing of religiously based oaths as to the asil or "pure" breeding of the animal. Conversely, some animals may have a recorded pedigree or even a registry, but not be considered "purebred". Today the modern Anglo-Arabian horse, a cross of Thoroughbred and Arabian bloodlines, is considered such a case.

Purebreds by animal

Purebred dogs

A purebred dog is a dog of a modern breed of dog, with written documentation showing the individual purebred dog's descent from its breeds' foundation stock. In dogs, the term breed is used two ways: loosely, to refer to dog types or landraces of dog (also called natural breeds or ancient breeds); or more precisely, to refer to modern breeds of dog, which are documented so as to be known to be descended from specific ancestors, that closely resemble others of their breed in appearance, movement, way of working and other characters; and that reproduce with offspring closely resembling each other and their parents. Purebred dogs are breeds in the second sense.

New breeds of dog are constantly being created, and there are many websites for new breed associations and breed clubs offering legitimate registrations for new or rare breeds. When dogs of a new breed are "visibly similar in most characteristics" and have reliable documented descent from a "known and designated foundation stock", then they can then be considered members of a breed, and, if an individual dog is documented and registered, it can be called purebred.

Purebred horses

The domestication of the horse resulted in a small number of domesticated stallions (possibly a single male ancestor) being crossed on wild mares that had adapted to local conditions. This ultimately produced horses of four basic body types, once thought to be wild prototypes, but now considered to be landraces. Many of these animals were then bred true to original type by selected breeding, though emphasizing certain inherent traits (such as a good temperament, suitable to training by humans) to a greater degree than others. In other cases, horses of different body types were cross bred until a desired characteristic was achieved and bred true.

Written and oral histories of various animals or pedigrees of certain types of horse have been kept throughout history, though breed registry stud books trace back to about the 13th century, at least in Europe, when pedigrees were tracked in writing, and the practice of declaring a type of horse to be a breed or a purebred became more widespread.

Certain horse breeds, such as the Andalusian horse and the Arabian horse, are claimed by aficionados of the respective breeds to be ancient, near-pure descendants from an ancient wild prototype, though mapping of the horse genome as well as the mtDNA and y-DNA of various breeds has largely disproved such claims.

Purebred cats

A cat whose ancestry is formally registered is called a pedigreed or purebred cat. Technically, a purebred cat is one whose ancestry contains only individuals of the same breed. A pedigreed cat is one whose ancestry is recorded, but may have ancestors of different breeds.

The list of cat breeds is quite large: most cat registries actually recognize between 30 and 40 breeds of cats, and several more are in development, with one or more new breeds being recognized each year on average, having distinct features and heritage. Owners and breeders compete in cat shows to see whose animal bears the closest resemblance (best conformance) to an idealized definition, based on breed type and the breed standard for each breed.

Because of common crossbreeding in populated areas, many cats are simply identified as belonging to the mixed types of domestic long-haired and domestic short-haired cat, depending on their type of fur.

Some original cat breeds that have a distinct phenotype that is the main type occurring naturally as the dominant domesticated cat type in their region of origin are sometimes considered subspecies and in the past received names as such, although this is no longer supported by feline biologists. with F. silvestris the wild cat and F. s. catus the domestic. Some of these cat breeds (with their invalid scientific names for historical interest) are:
F. catus anura - the Manx
F. catus siamensis - the Siamese
F. catus cartusenensis - the Chartreux
F. catus angorensis - the Turkish Angora

Purebred livestock

Most domesticated farm animals also have true-breeding breeds and breed registries, particularly cattle, sheep, goats, rabbits, and pigs. While animals bred strictly for market sale are not always purebreds, or if purebred may not be registered, most livestock producers value the presence of purebred genetic stock for the consistency of traits such animals provide. It is common for a farm's male breeding stock in particular to be of purebred, pedigreed lines.

In cattle, some breeders associations make a difference between "purebred" and "full blood". Full blood cattle are fully pedigreed animals, where every ancestor is registered in the herdbook and shows the typical characteristics of the breed. Purebred are those animals that have been bred-up to purebred status as a result of using full blood animals to cross with an animal of another breed. The breeders association rules the percentage of fullblood genetics required for an animal to be considered purebred, usually above 87.5%.

Artificial breeding via artificial insemination or embryo transfer is often used in sheep and cattle breeding to quickly expand, or improve purebred herds. Embryo transfer techniques allow top quality female livestock to have a greater influence on the genetic advancement of a herd or flock in much the same way that artificial insemination has allowed greater use of superior sires.

Wild species, landraces, and purebred species

Breeders of purebred domesticated species discourage crossbreeding with wild species, unless a deliberate decision is made to incorporate a trait of a wild ancestor back into a given breed or strain. Wild populations of animals and plants have evolved naturally over millions of years through a process of natural selection in contrast to human controlled Selective breeding or artificial selection for desirable traits from the human point of view. Normally, these two methods of reproduction operate independently of one another. However, an intermediate form of selective breeding, wherein animals or plants are bred by humans, but with an eye to adaptation to natural region-specific conditions and an acceptance of natural selection to weed out undesirable traits, created many ancient domesticated breeds or types now known as landraces.

Many times, domesticated species live in or near areas which also still hold naturally evolved, region-specific wild ancestor species and subspecies. In some cases, a domesticated species of plant or animal may become feral, living wild. Other times, a wild species will come into an area inhabited by a domesticated species. Some of these situations lead to the creation of hybridized plants or animals, a cross between the native species and a domesticated one. This type of crossbreeding, termed genetic pollution by those who are concerned about preserving the genetic base of the wild species, has become a major concern. Hybridization is also a concern to the breeders of purebred species as well, particularly if the gene pool is small and if such crossbreeding or hybridization threatens the genetic base of the domesticated purebred population.

The concern with genetic pollution of a wild population is that hybridized animals and plants may not be as genetically strong as naturally evolved region specific wild ancestors wildlife which can survive without human husbandry and have high immunity to natural diseases. The concern of purebred breeders with wildlife hybridizing a domesticated species is that it can coarsen or degrade the specific qualities of a breed developed for a specific purpose, sometimes over many generations. Thus, both purebred breeders and wildlife biologists share a common interest in preventing accidental hybridization.

See also 

 Dogs portal
 True-breeding organism
 List of dog breeds
Breed registry
Cat breed
Closed stud book
Consanguinity
Crossbreeding
Open stud book
Dog breed 
Dog breeding
Dog hybrids and crossbreeds
Endogamy
Horse breeding
Inbreeding
Mixed-breed dog
Pedigreed animal documentation

References

Animal breeding
Livestock